"Hush Hush" is a song by American recording artist Alexis Jordan, taken from her self-titled debut album (2011). It was released as the album's third single on June 10, 2011. The dance-pop song was written by Autumn Rowe, Stargate and Sandy Vee. Alexis called the song "feisty" and that it was a song that "unleashes a fiery side of her personality".

Background
Speaking in May 2011 to urban writer Pete Lewis of Blues & Soul, Jordan described the lyrical background to the song: "It's really dealing with the situation where - if you've been hurt, or someone's treated you wrong or cheated on you in a relationship - you're basically saying 'Be quiet! I don't wanna hear it! I'm gonna move ON!'... So what I particularly liked about the song is that it's a very powerful statement for anybody who's been in that kind of situation."

Production
"Hush Hush" is written by Autumn Rowe, StarGate and Sandy Vee, and it was produced by Stargate and Sandy Vee. When premiering the song with Digital Spy, Jordan discussed the song. "The thing I love about this track is that it has a dance beat that is irresistible. You can't not dance to it! It's also quite fierce and feisty, but in a fun and positive way." Discussing the recording process of the record, she insisted: "It was a very calm and fun process. I was always in the studio smiling! It was something that I felt so blessed to be doing - it never felt like a chore. I am thankful to the whole team around me though, we mesh very well together."

Reception

Critical reception
BBC Music described the production as "clattery", while praising the strength and soul in Jordan's vocals as "empowering". Lewis Corner of Digital Spy gave the song four stars out of five and wrote, ""Hush, hush, hush/ You know I'm coming for ya/ Tough, tough, tough," she threatens over a relentless Stargate-helmed disco riff and dance beats that pack more camp oomph than a Pineapple Dance Studios session with Louie Spence." 4Music's David Griffiths called the song "another dancefloor-friendly pop track that will have you on your feet in seconds."

Chart performance
The song peaked at number 36 in Ireland, and 66 in the UK from strong downloads from the album, almost one month before the official release. The song peaked on number 12 in The Netherlands.

Music video
The music video for the song was uploaded to YouTube on 6 May 2011 and lasts four minutes and six seconds. The music video was directed by Clifton Bell.

Track listing

UK Digital EP
"Hush Hush" – 3:42
"Hush Hush" (Tom Neville's Turned Up to 11 Remix) – 6:21
"Hush Hush" (Cahill Full On Club Remix) – 7:10
"Hush Hush" (Cahill Full On Dub Remix) – 7:10
"Hush Hush" (Cahill Lounge Remix) – 7:11
"Hush Hush" (Full Intention Club Remix) – 6:10

Australian Digital EP
"Hush Hush" – 3:42
"Hush Hush" (Cahill Full On Remix Edit) – 3:29
"Hush Hush" (Full Intention Radio Remix) – 4:54
"Hush Hush" (Tom Neville's Turned Up To 11 Radio Remix) – 3:42
"Hush Hush" (Stargate Extended Mix) – 5:20

Credits and personnel
Autumn Rowe – songwriter
StarGate (Mikkel S. Eriksen and Tor Erik Hermansen) – songwriter, producer and instrumentation
Sandy Vee – songwriter, producer, recording, mixing and instrumentation
Mikkel S. Eriksen – recording
Phil Tan – mixing
Damien Lewis – additional and assistant engineering
Tom Coyne – mastering

Credits adapted from Alexis Jordan album booklet.

Charts

Weekly charts

Year-end charts

Release history

References

2011 singles
Roc Nation singles
Alexis Jordan songs
Song recordings produced by Stargate (record producers)
Songs written by Tor Erik Hermansen
Songs written by Mikkel Storleer Eriksen
Dance-pop songs
Songs written by Sandy Vee
Songs written by Autumn Rowe
Song recordings produced by Sandy Vee